The Minnesota Pollution Control Agency (MPCA) is a Minnesota state agency that monitors environmental quality, offers technical and financial assistance, and enforces environmental regulations for the State of Minnesota.  The MPCA finds and cleans up spills and leaks that can affect public health and the environment. The MPCA staff develops statewide policies and supports environmental education, working with such partners as citizens, municipalities, businesses, environmental groups, and educators to prevent pollution and conserve resources.

History 
The agency was created on May 18, 1967, to further strengthen Senator Gordon Rosenmeier's environmental policies following the Mississippi River oil spill.

Further reading

References

External links
Minnesota Pollution Control Agency - official site

Environment of Minnesota
State environmental protection agencies of the United States
Pollution Control Agency